Omphalea malayana is a species of flowering plant in the family Euphorbiaceae, native to Peninsular Malaysia (Pulao Tioman), Borneo (Sarawak) and the Philippines (Luzon). It was first described by Elmer Drew Merrill in 1916.

Conservation
Trigonostemon arboreus was assessed as "vulnerable" in the 1998 IUCN Red List, where it is said to be native only to Peninsular Malaysia. , T. arboreus was regarded as a synonym of Omphalea malayana, which has a wider distribution.

References

malayana
Flora of Borneo
Flora of Malaya
Flora of the Philippines
Plants described in 1916